Mayo Creek is a  long 4th order tributary to the Hyco River in Halifax County, Virginia.

Variant names
According to the Geographic Names Information System, it has also been known historically as:
Maho Creek
Mayho Creek
Mayo River
Sugar Tree Creek

Course

Watershed

References

Rivers of North Carolina
Rivers of Virginia
Rivers of Halifax County, Virginia
Rivers of Person County, North Carolina
Tributaries of the Roanoke River